Kenneth Edward Snelling (December 11, 1918 – September 17, 1994) was a fullback in the National Football League. He was drafted by the Green Bay Packers in the seventh round of the 1943 NFL Draft and later played with the team during the 1945 NFL season.

References

1918 births
1994 deaths
American football fullbacks
UCLA Bruins football players
Green Bay Packers players
People from Musselshell County, Montana
Players of American football from Montana